Københavns Amt is a former county (Danish, amt) on the island of Zealand (Sjælland) in eastern Denmark.  It covered the municipalities in the metropolitan Copenhagen area, with the exception of Copenhagen and Frederiksberg. Effective January 1, 2007, the county was abolished and merged into Region Hovedstaden (i.e. Copenhagen Capital Region).

The county was seated in Glostrup (from 1 January 1993; between 1952 and 1992 the county administration was located on Blegdamsvej in Copenhagen Municipality, which was surrounded by, but not part of the county).

List of County Mayors

Municipalities (1970-2006)

Albertslund
Ballerup
Brøndby
Dragør
Gentofte
Gladsaxe
Glostrup
Herlev
Hvidovre
Høje-Taastrup
Ishøj
Ledøje-Smørum
Lyngby-Taarbæk
Rødovre
Søllerød
Tårnby
Vallensbæk
Værløse

Former counties of Denmark (1970–2006)
Capital Region of Denmark